The Grand Trunk Cemetery also known as (Back Cove Cemetery or East Deering Cemetery) is a small inactive cemetery in the East Deering neighborhood of Portland, Maine. Established around 1793, the cemetery was the burial ground for those who lived in the area until 1898 when it was declared inactive. It is now located behind Presumpscot Elementary School and is bordered to the east by main line of the Grand Trunk Railway. Largely forgotten for decades, community members began reclaiming the space and it was officially re-dedicated in 2014.

References

Further reading

External links
 Remnant: Grand Trunk Cemetery Reclamation Project
 Grand Trunk Cemetery collection, 2010–2015 Chapman, Marianne J., Collection 2905, Maine Historical Society
 

Cemeteries in Portland, Maine
1793 establishments in Maine
Cemeteries established in the 1790s